Valin Lamar Danez Bodie (born 9 May 1995) is a Bahamian footballer who plays for the Bahamas national football team. Bodie played the 2021 UPSL season with Tulsa, Oklahoma-based Side 92 FC.

He is also a soil scientist who owns and operates Environmental Soil Solutions in Tulsa. He earned his Bachelor of Science degree with a concentration in Global Environmental Sustainability from Oral Roberts University, where he met his wife Keisha.

International career
In July 2016, Bodie was called up to the Bahamas national beach soccer team. Bodie made his senior international debut for the Bahamas on 18 November 2018, playing all ninety minutes in a 1-1 home draw with Anguilla.

References

External links

1995 births
Living people
Bahamian footballers
Bahamas international footballers
Association football goalkeepers
Oral Roberts Golden Eagles men's soccer players
Cavalier FC players
Sportspeople from Nassau, Bahamas
United Premier Soccer League players
Bahamian expatriate footballers
Expatriate soccer players in the United States
Bahamian expatriate sportspeople in the United States